Plateau Valley is a valley in south-central Sevier County, Utah, United States.

Description
It is located immediately north of Grass Valley, and is bounded on the west by Mormon Mountain and on the east by Boobe Hole Mountain. The Koosharem Reservoir is located in the southern part of the valley. Utah State Route 24 runs north-to-south through the valley.

See also

 List of valleys of Utah

References

External links

Valleys of Utah
Landforms of Sevier County, Utah